Ralph Klein, also known as Rafael "Ralph" Ram ( July 29, 1931 – August 7, 2008) was an Israeli professional basketball player and coach. In Israel, he was known as "Mr. Basketball".

Early life
Klein was born in Berlin, during the time of the Weimar Republic, to an affluent Hungarian Jewish family, that returned to Budapest, before the outbreak of World War II. His father was murdered in Auschwitz, but he and his family survived thanks to efforts by Raoul Wallenberg.

Basketball playing career

Club career
After the war, at the age of 16, Klein began playing football, but later moved to basketball, and played in the Hungarian national league. In 1951, he immigrated to Israel, with his mother.

After serving in the Israeli navy, he joined Maccabi Tel Aviv, with which he played in more than 160 games, through 1964. With Maccabi Tel Aviv, he scored 2,701 total points, and won eight Israeli Super League national championships and six Israeli State Cups.

National team career

Klein was also a member of the senior Israel national basketball team. With Israel's senior national team, he played at the 1952 Summer Olympic Games, and at the 1954 edition of the FIBA World Cup. He also played at the 1953, 1959, 1961, and 1963 editions of the FIBA EuroBasket. He also played at the 1960 Pre-Olympic Tournament. In total, Klein played in 68 games with the senior Israeli national team.

Basketball coaching career

Clubs
Klein began his coaching career in 1964. In 1969, he was appointed as head coach of Maccabi Tel Aviv, with which he won 10 Israeli Super League championships, 9 Israeli State Cups, and the FIBA European Champions Cup (EuroLeague) championship of the 1976–77 season. He also coached the German League club Saturn Köln, and he won another Israeli State Cup title with Hapoel Tel Aviv.

National teams
As head coach of the senior Israeli national team, Klein won a silver medal at the 1979 EuroBasket, and also finished in sixth place at the 1981 EuroBasket and the 1983 EuroBasket. In 1983, he unexpectedly announced his appointment as the head coach of the senior West German national team.

Klein led the West German national team to an eighth-place finish at the 1984 Summer Olympic Games, and to a fifth-place finish at the 1985 EuroBasket, which was held on West German home soil.

Personal life
In 2007, Klein was diagnosed as suffering from colorectal cancer, and he was believed to be on his deathbed. However, his health improved and he even went back to coaching.

He died of cancer on August 7, 2008, at Sheba Medical Center, in Tel HaShomer.

Awards
In 2006, Klein was awarded the Israel Prize for sport, along with former football goalkeeper Ya'akov Hodorov.

Commemoration
 In 2010, the filming of "Playoff" began, a movie based on Klein's life story, and directed by Israeli movie director, Eran Riklis.
 Israeli basketball team, Elitzur Elkana, whom Klein coached towards the end of his life, is named after the veteran Israeli coach (Elizur "Ralph Klein" Elkanah). The basketball team also wrote a Sefer Torah, in the name and honor of Klein.
The veterans group of Maccabi Tel Aviv basketball team commemorates the achievements and memory of Ralph Klein, and since his death, it is named "Maccabi Ralph Klein Tel Aviv".

See also
List of Israel Prize recipients
List of EuroLeague-winning head coaches

References

External links
FIBA Archive Player Profile 1
FIBA Archive Player Profile 2
Sports-Reference.com Player Profile

1931 births
2008 deaths
Basketball players at the 1952 Summer Olympics
BSC Saturn Köln coaches
Deaths from cancer in Israel
Deaths from colorectal cancer
EuroLeague-winning coaches
Hungarian basketball coaches
Hungarian emigrants to Israel
Hungarian Jews
Hungarian men's basketball players
Israeli basketball coaches
Israeli Basketball Premier League players
Israeli men's basketball players
Israeli people of Hungarian-Jewish descent
Israel Prize in sport recipients
Jewish men's basketball players
Maccabi Tel Aviv B.C. players
Maccabi Tel Aviv B.C. coaches
Olympic basketball players of Israel
Basketball players from Berlin
Sportspeople from Tel Aviv
Shooting guards
1954 FIBA World Championship players